Ivan Lučić may refer to:
 Ivan Lučić-Lucius (1604–1679), Dalmatian historian
 Ivan Lučić (footballer, born 1995), Austrian football goalkeeper 
 Ivan Lučić (footballer, born 1996), Serbian football goalkeeper